Kerry Keating (born July 15, 1971) is an American college basketball coach and the former head men's basketball coach at Santa Clara University.

Early life and college education
Keating was born in Stoughton, Massachusetts and grew up in Rockville Centre, on New York's Long Island. He attended Archbishop Molloy High School in Queens and Seton Hall Preparatory School in West Orange, New Jersey.

Keating enrolled at Seton Hall University in 1989 and played on the Seton Hall Pirates men's basketball team as a walk-on as a freshman under coach P. J. Carlesimo. The following year, Keating became a student assistant and video coordinator on Carlesimo's staff. Keating graduated from Seton Hall in 1993.

Coaching career
Keating served as administrative assistant for Wake Forest head coach Dave Odom in the 1993–94 season. The following season, Keating joined Jan van Breda Kolff's staff at Vanderbilt as an assistant coach. Keating then returned to Seton Hall University in 1995 to be an assistant coach for three seasons, first under George Blaney then under Tommy Amaker.

Having previously worked with Buzz Peterson as assistant coaches at Vanderbilt, Keating became an assistant coach under Peterson at Appalachian State in 1998. Keating would follow Peterson to Tulsa in 2000 and Tennessee in 2001.

In 2003, Keating joined Ben Howland's staff at UCLA. Rivals.com ranked Keating as one of the nation's best recruiters of incoming talent in 2005.  These accomplishments and reputation helped Keating become the 14th head coach of Santa Clara when the school decided to replace longtime coach Dick Davey.

Keating signed a six-year contract through 2013 at his hiring and was extended for two years through the 2014–15 season in 2011.  In October 2013, Keating signed a multi-year contract extension. He is Santa Clara University's second highest paid employee.

He has led Santa Clara to the 2011 CollegeInsider.com Tournament and the 2013 College Basketball Invitational championships. Santa Clara is the first school to win both the CIT and CBI titles.

Keating left Santa Clara after a nine-year tenure that saw him go 139–159 overall, and 53–88 in the WCC.

Post-Coaching
After leaving Santa Clara University, Kerry was a scouting consultant for the Houston Rockets.
Kerry regularly appears as an analyst for ABC7 KGO-TV “After The Game” NBA live post-game show in San Francisco. He regularly advises tech startups
through his consulting company, The Vinculum Group. Some of his companies include Hot Mic, TaskHuman, FanWide,
Boost, SocialVenu, Mojo Vision, Adapt Inc., and Versalume.

Head coaching record

References

1971 births
Living people
American men's basketball coaches
Appalachian State Mountaineers men's basketball coaches
Archbishop Molloy High School alumni
Basketball coaches from Massachusetts
Basketball coaches from New York (state)
Basketball players from Massachusetts
Basketball players from New York (state)
People from Rockville Centre, New York
People from Stoughton, Massachusetts
Santa Clara Broncos men's basketball coaches
Seton Hall Pirates men's basketball coaches
Seton Hall Pirates men's basketball players
Seton Hall Preparatory School alumni
Tennessee Volunteers basketball coaches
Tulsa Golden Hurricane men's basketball coaches
UCLA Bruins men's basketball coaches
Vanderbilt Commodores men's basketball coaches
American men's basketball players